Neumoegenia poetica, the poetry moth, is a species of moth in the family Noctuidae (the owlet moths). It is found in North America.

The MONA or Hodges number for Neumoegenia poetica is 9737.

References

Further reading

External links
 

Amphipyrinae
Articles created by Qbugbot
Moths described in 1882